Ubayy ibn Ka'b (died 649), also known as Abu Mundhir, was a companion of the Islamic prophet Muhammad and a person of high esteem in the early Muslim community.

Biography
Ubayy was born in Medina (then known as Yathrib), into the tribe of the Banu Khazraj. He was one of the first to accept Islam and pledge allegiance to Muhammad at al-Aqabah before the migration to Medina, becoming one of the Ansar. He joined the second pledge at al-Aqabah. Later, he participated in the battle of Badr and other following engagements.

He acted as a scribe for Muhammad, writing letters for him. Ubayy was one of the few who put the Qur'anic Surahs into writing and had a Mushaf of his own. Following Muhammad's death, he was one of the twenty-five Hafiz, people who knew the Qur'an completely by heart.

He was part of the consultative group (mushawarah) to which the caliph Abu Bakr referred many problems. It included Umar, Uthman, Ali, Abd-al-Rahman ibn Awf, Muadh ibn Jabal, Ubayy ibn Ka'b, and Zayd ibn Thabit.

Umar later consulted the same group when he was caliph. Specifically for fatwas (legal judgments) he referred to Ali ibn Abi Talib, Uthman, Ubayy, and Zayd ibn Thabit.

Ubayy died in the year 649 CE (30 AH), during the caliphate of Uthman.

See also
Ubay (name)
Ka'b (name)

References

Ansar (Islam)
Sahabah hadith narrators
649 deaths
Year of birth unknown
Khazrajite people